A Direct Carbon Fuel Cell (DCFC) is a fuel cell that uses a carbon rich material as a fuel such as bio-mass or coal. The cell produces energy by combining carbon and oxygen, which releases carbon dioxide as a by-product. It is also called coal fuel cells (CFCs), carbon-air fuel cells (CAFCs), direct carbon/coal fuel cells (DCFCs), and DC-SOFC.

The total reaction of the cell is C + O2 → CO2. 
The process in half cell notation:
 Anode: C + 2O2− → CO2 + 4e−
 Cathode: O2 + 4e− → 2O2−

Despite this release of carbon dioxide, the direct carbon fuel cell is more environmentally friendly than traditional carbon burning techniques. Due to its higher efficiency, it requires less carbon to produce the same amount of energy. Also, because pure carbon dioxide is emitted, carbon capture techniques are much cheaper than for conventional power stations. Utilized carbon can be in the form of coal, coke, char, or a non-fossilized source of carbon.
At least four types of DCFC exist.

Solid oxide fuel cell based design 
 Anode reactions: 

Direct electrochemical oxidation path:
 C + 2O2− → CO2 + 4e−
 C + O2− → CO+ 2e−

Indirect electrochemical oxidation path: CO + O2− → CO2 + 2e−

Boudouard reaction (indirect chemical reaction path): C + CO2 → 2CO

 Cathode reaction:  O2 + 4e− → 2O2−

Molten hydroxides fuel cell 
William W. Jacques obtained US Patent 555,511 in this type of fuel cell in 1896. Prototypes have been demonstrated by the research group, SARA, Inc.

Molten carbonate fuel cell 
William W. Jacques obtained a Canadian patent for the  molten carbonate fuel cell in 1897
It has been developed further at the  Lawrence Livermore Laboratory.

Molten tin anode 
This design utilizes molten tin and tin oxide as an inter stage reaction between oxidation of the carbon dissolving in the anode and reduction of oxygen at the solid oxide cathode.

See also
Glossary of fuel cell terms

External links
CSIRO Energy
ERTL, School of Environmental Science and Engineering, Gwangju Institute of Science and Technology
CSIRO Advanced carbon power
Direct Carbon Fuel Cells an ultra low emission technology for power generation
Direct Carbon Fuel Cells, Alternative to a Hydrogen Economy? 
Direct Carbon Fuel Cell Workshop
A closer look at Direct Carbon Fuel Cells: the ultimate biomass conversion technology?
DCFC Paper, Enhanced anode interface for electrochemical oxidation of solid fuel in direct carbon fuel cells: The role of liquid Sn in mixed state
Science and Technology Review

References

Fuel cells